Jersey Township is one of the 25 townships of Licking County, Ohio, United States. As of the 2010 census, the population was 2,740, of whom 2,717 lived in the unincorporated part of the township.

Geography
Located on the western edge of the county, it borders the following townships and city:
Monroe Township - north
Liberty Township - northeast corner
St. Albans Township - east
Harrison Township - southeast corner
Pataskala - south
Jefferson Township, Franklin County - southwest corner
Plain Township, Franklin County - west
Harlem Township, Delaware County - northwest corner

Part of the city of New Albany is located in western Jersey Township.

Name and history
Jersey Township was established in 1820. The township was named after New Jersey, the native state of a large share of the early settlers. It is the only Jersey Township statewide.

Government
The township is governed by a three-member board of trustees, who are elected in November of odd-numbered years to a four-year term beginning on the following January 1. Two are elected in the year after the presidential election and one is elected in the year before it. There is also an elected township fiscal officer, who serves a four-year term beginning on April 1 of the year after the election, which is held in November of the year before the presidential election. Vacancies in the fiscal officership or on the board of trustees are filled by the remaining trustees.

References

External links

County website

Townships in Licking County, Ohio
Townships in Ohio